RHO family interacting cell polarization regulator 2 is a protein that in humans is encoded by the RIPOR2 gene.

Function 

The protein encoded by this gene stimulates the formation of a non-mitotic multinucleate syncytium from proliferative cytotrophoblasts during trophoblast differentiation. Alternative splicing of this gene results in multiple transcript variants. [provided by RefSeq, Nov 2013].

Clinical significance 

Mutations in RIPOR2 are associated to hearing loss.

References

Further reading